Hirvensalmi is a municipality of Finland.

It is located in the Southern Savonia region. The municipality has a population of 
which 
is water. The population density is
.

Neighbour municipalities: Joutsa, Kangasniemi, Mikkeli, Mäntyharju and Pertunmaa.

Hirvensalmi is often said to be an island municipality. Most people live on the mainland, but living on an island is not unheard of. Most islands, though, are only inhabited during the summer holidays, when holidaymakers come mainly from Southern Finland and double the population of Hirvensalmi. In the north lake Puula marks the border of Hirvensalmi and Kangasniemi, and in the west lake Suontee separates it from Joutsa.

The municipality is unilingual Finnish.

Some villages
Hirvenlahti, Hirvensalmi, Hämeenmäki, Kekkola, Kilkki, Kissakoski, Kotkatvesi, Kuitula, Lahnaniemi, Lelkola, Malvaniemi, Monikkala, Noitti, Pääskynsaari, Suonsalmi, Syväsmäki, Vahvamäki, Vahvaselkä, and Väisälä.

References

External links

Municipality of Hirvensalmi – Official site 

 
Populated places established in 1656
1656 establishments in Sweden